Guilherme Afif Domingos (born 18 September 1943) is a Brazilian company administrator, entrepreneur, and politician of Lebanese descent, member of the Social Democratic Party (PSD). He was Vice Governor of São Paulo between 2011 and 2014, and chief-minister of the Secretariat of Micro and Small Business of the Presidency of the Republic between 2013 and 2015. Currently, is president of the Sebrae.

Is married to the writer Silvia Maria Dellivenneri, with whom he has four children and ten grandchildren.

After the leaving of former Minister of Finance Henrique Meirelles from the PSD, Afif started his pre-campaign to be confirmed as the party candidate for President of Brazil in the July convention.

References

External links
 

|-

|-

|-

|-

|-

1943 births
Living people
People from São Paulo
Liberal Front Party (Brazil) politicians
Liberal Party (Brazil, 1985) politicians
Democratic Social Party politicians
Brazilian people of Lebanese descent
Members of the Chamber of Deputies (Brazil) from São Paulo